Sandra Crouch (born July 1, 1942) is an American gospel music performer, drummer and songwriter.

Musical career
Crouch won a Grammy Award in 1984 for "Best Soul Gospel Performance, Female" for the 1983 album, "We Sing Praises," and was nominated for a Grammy in 1986 in the category "Best Soul Gospel Performance, Duo, Group, Chorus or Choir" (co-nominee Jean Johnson) for the song, Completely Yes from the 1985 album, "We're Waiting."   During the late 1960s through the early 1970s, she played the tambourine on a number of Motown recording sessions in Los Angeles, including the Jackson 5 hits "I Want You Back" and "ABC."

Personal life
Crouch was born on July 1, 1942, in Los Angeles, California along with her twin brother Andraé.  Until his death in January 2015, she and her brother co-pastored Christ Memorial Church of God in Christ in Pacoima, California.  On the day of her brother's death,  Crouch released the following statement: "Today my twin brother, womb-mate and best friend went home to be with the Lord. Please keep me, my family and our church family in your prayers. I tried to keep him here but God loved him best."

Discography
Gospel Legacy, 2008
With All Of My Heart, 1992
We're Waiting For You, 1985
Completely Yes, 1985 (Grammy nominee)
We Sing Praises, 1983 (Grammy winner)
With Lalo Schifrin
Rock Requiem (Verve, 1971)
With The Fearless Flyers
The Fearless Flyers - "Barbara" (Vulf Records, 2018)
The Fearless Flyers - "Signed, Sealed, Delivered" (Vulf Records, 2018)

References

1942 births
American gospel singers
American women singers
Living people
Grammy Award winners
Pentecostals from California
Members of the Church of God in Christ
Church of God in Christ pastors
Singers from San Francisco
Drummers from San Francisco
Tambourine players
Songwriters from San Francisco
20th-century American drummers
American women drummers
African-American women musicians